County Line station is an interurban rapid transit station on the SEPTA Norristown High Speed Line (Route 100). The station is located on County Line Road near Matsonford Road in Radnor Township, Pennsylvania. Local, Hughes Park Express, and Norristown Express trains all stop at County Line. Trains running south of this station cross under the Keystone Corridor (Philadelphia to Harrisburg Main Line) that carries the Paoli/Thorndale Line as well as Amtrak's Pennsylvanian and Keystone Service trains.

Station layout

History
The station was built as an infill station in the 1930s along the Lehigh Valley Transit Company line. The community raised $1,300 for the station's construction.

References

External links

 County Line Road entrance from Google Maps Street View

Radnor Township, Delaware County, Pennsylvania
SEPTA Norristown High Speed Line stations